The Warren and Myrta Bacon House, 1802 Broadway, Lubbock, Texas, United States, was designed and built from plans by W. M. Rice of Amarillo, Texas, in 1916.  It was designed along neo-classical lines for Warren A. Bacon, a successful local businessman and civic leader.  The house was placed on the National Register of Historic Places in 1982.

Owners
Warren Bacon lived in Lubbock from 1893 and resided in this house from its construction until his death in 1938.  
Mrs. Myrta Bacon, daughter of George M. Hunt, lived in here from its construction until her death in 1967.  
In 1981, the Episcopal Diocese of Northwest Texas acquired the house and remains the present owner.

See also

National Register of Historic Places listings in Lubbock County, Texas
Recorded Texas Historic Landmarks in Lubbock County

References

External links

Houses in Lubbock County, Texas
Houses on the National Register of Historic Places in Texas
National Register of Historic Places in Lubbock, Texas
Recorded Texas Historic Landmarks